Argelès-sur-Mer (literally Argelès on Sea;  or), commonly known as Argelès, is a commune in the Pyrénées-Orientales department in the administrative region of Occitania, France.

It is about 25 km from Perpignan.

Geography
Argelès-sur-Mer is located in the canton of La Côte Vermeille and in the arrondissement of Céret.

Argelès-sur-Mer is on the Côte Vermeille at the foot of the Albères mountain range, close to the Spanish border. It has the longest beach in the Pyrenées Orientales.

History

During World War II, Argelès-sur-Mer was the location of a concentration camp, where up to 100,000 defeated Spanish Republicans were interned next to a windy beach in abysmal sanitary conditions by the French government after the defeat of the Spanish Republic. The refugees streamed to the camp from the winter of 1938/39 after the collapse of the Catalan front following the rebel offensive.

Government and politics

Mayors

Population and society

Demography

Education

Sports 
Étoile sportive catalane is the rugby union club of Argelès-sur-Mer.

Culture

Sites of interest 

Buildings
 Dolmen of the Collets de Cotlliure (Monument historique)
 Dolmen of the Cova de l'Alarb (Monument historique)
 Dolmen of Sant Pere dels Forquets
 Chapel of Saint-Jérôme d'Argelès, from the 10th century
 Church of Saint-Ferréol de la Pava (Monument historique), from the 10th century
 Parish church of Notre-Dame del Prat, from the 14th to the 20th centuries (Monument historique)
 Church of Sainte-Marie de Torreneules, from the 8th to the 10th centuries
 Abbey of Valbonne, from the 13th to the 14th centuries
 Church of Saint-Laurent-du-Mont, from the 12th century (Monument historique)
 Church of Saint-Martin-et-Sainte-Croix, from the 11th or 12th century, and the old village of Taxo d'Avall (both Monument historique)
 Church of Saint-Pierre dels Forquets, pre-romanesque ruins
 Castle of Pujols, from the 13th century (Monument historique)
 Massane tower, in the Albera Massif, from the 13th century
 Castle of Valmy, from the 19th century
 Casa de l'Albera, museum about the Albera Massif

Natural sites
 National nature reserve of the Mas Larrieu
 National nature reserve of the Massane forest
 The Bois des pins is the historical pine forest located near the beach front. Created in the 1860s by the General Council of the Pyrénées-Orientales, it still has to this day over 8,000 centenarian pines.

Notable people 
 Marcelle Narbonne (1898-2012) : supercentenarian who lived and died in Argelès-sur-Mer.
 David Ensor (1906-1987) : British lawyer, actor, author and Labour Party politician, lived and died in Argelès-sur-Mer.
 Marc Lièvremont (1968-) : former rugby union footballer raised in Argelès-sur-Mer and former member of the Étoile sportive catalane club.

See also
Communes of the Pyrénées-Orientales department

References

External links

 Town council website
 Information in Catalan Encyclopaedia

Communes of Pyrénées-Orientales
Northern Catalonia
Seaside resorts in France